Veterans Studies is an academic field analyzing and reflecting upon the diverse experiences of military veterans and their families in society. As an interdisciplinary field committed to advancing understanding of all aspects of the “veteran in society," inquiry draws on the intersections of the theoretical and the applied, the creative and the performative, the normative and the empirical. Topics within veterans studies could include but are not limited to combat exposure, reintegration challenges, and the complex systems and institutions that shape the "veteran experience." Veterans studies, by its very nature, may analyze experiences closely tied to military studies, but the emphasis of veterans studies is the “veteran experience,” that is, what happens after the service member departs the Armed Forces.

Academic Programs in the United States 

There are four universities that offer veterans studies programs in the United States.

Arizona State University 
The Veterans, Society and Service Certificate is an 18 credit certificate program offered by Arizona State University. Offered online and on campus, the interdisciplinary certificate "program trains students to listen to, learn from, serve, research, and advocate for veterans and their families."

Eastern Kentucky University 

Eastern Kentucky University was the first university to offer an academic minor (18 credit hours) and certificate (24 credit hours) in veterans studies in 2010. "The certificate allows students to analyze the veteran’s role in society, emphasizing the intersectionality of veteran identity, equipping students with a variety of skills and disciplinary perspectives through which to develop the cultural competency needed to understand and interact with veterans in a variety of personal and professional settings."

University of Missouri—St. Louis 
The Department of Sociology at the University of Missouri—St. Louis has offered a Minor in Veterans Studies since 2014. Multidisciplinary coursework offers students a “nuanced understanding of  the military and veteran experience, the role veterans play in our society, and the obligations our society might hold towards this subset of our population” to prepare students to “work for off with veterans” as well as to “encourage and enable student veterans to reflect more deeply on their service experiences.”

University of California, Irvine 
Since 2019 the School of Social Sciences at the University of California, Irvine (UCI) has offered a three-course “multidisciplinary, undergraduate” certificate in veterans studies open to veterans and non-veteran students with an estimated completion of the certificate within two years. The three courses: Veterans in History and Society, Veterans’ Voices, and Veterans’ Transitions, promote the critical analysis of veterans’ diverse and complex experiences by investigating veterans and their multiple roles in US history and society.

Publications

Journal of Veterans Studies 
The Journal of Veterans Studies is an online, international, interdisciplinary academic journal (ISSN 2470-4768). It was founded in November 2015 by Mariana Grohowski, PhD, and published its first issue in July 2016. Open-access and peer-reviewed, its objective is to facilitate the scholarly investigation of military veterans' and their families’ experiences, specifically after the completion of their military service. The journal is published online periodically throughout the year. Articles are made available as soon as they are ready for open issues. The Journal is supported by the Veterans Studies Association and Virginia Tech Publishing.

The journal maintains an open access policy, believing that making research openly available promotes a mutual exchange of information. Authors retain copyright and can grant third parties the right to use, replicate, and distribute the article based on the Creative Commons license agreement.

References

External Links 

 Journal of Veterans Studies
 Veterans Studies Association

Academic disciplines
Cultural studies
Veterans' affairs in the United States
Open access journals